Raffaella (in some countries released as Hay que venir al sur) is a ninth studio album by Italian singer Raffaella Carrà, released in 1978 by CBS Italiana.

The album was certified gold in Greece.

Overview 
The album distributed in Spain, Colombia, Venezuela, Uruguay and the United States was titled Hay que venir al sur, retains the artwork and track layout of the Italian version, but with the songs translated into Spanish (except "Sono Nera" and "Amoa") with "Tango" replaced by its translation "Lola". In the Mexican version the tracks are ordered differently. In the rest of the world the disc was distributed with the title Raffaella keeping the songs in Italian, artwork and identical arrangement of the tracks.

Track listing

Credits 
 Raffaella Carrà – vocals
 Paolo Ormi – arrangement
 Antonio Marzullo – engineering
 Giuseppe Ranieri – assistant engineering
 Gaetano Vituzzi – engineering, mixing
 Gianni Boncompagni – production
 Bruno Vergottini – design
 Chiara Samugheo – photography

Charts

References

1978 albums
Raffaella Carrà albums
CBS Records albums